Nicotiana occidentalis, commonly known as native tobacco, is a short-lived herb native to Australia.

Description
It grows as an annual or short-lived perennial herb, from ten to 120 centimetres high, with white or pink flowers. It is densely covered in sticky hairs.

Taxonomy
It was first published in 1935 by Helen-Mar Wheeler, based on a specimen collected from Port Hedland in 1911.

Three subspecies are recognised. N. occidentalis subsp. obliqua is the only widespread subspecies; the other two, N. occidentalis subsp. occidentalis and N. occidentalis subsp. hesperis, are endemic to Western Australia.

Distribution and habitat
It occurs throughout mid-latitude mainland Australia, but not in the tropical north, nor in the cooler, wetter, southwest and southeast corners. It thus occurs in every mainland state except Victoria. It grows in sand, clay and stony soils, on plains, along creeklines, and upon coastal limestone.

References

occidentalis
Solanales of Australia
Flora of New South Wales
Flora of Queensland
Flora of South Australia
Flora of Western Australia
Tobacco
Tobacco in Australia